List of Irish Victoria Cross recipients lists all recipients of the Victoria Cross (post-nominal letters "VC") born on the island of Ireland, together with the date and place of their VC action. The Victoria Cross is the highest war honour of the British Empire and the Commonwealth of Nations. The whole island of Ireland was part of the United Kingdom until 1922 when it was partitioned into Northern Ireland and the Irish Free State. On 18 April 1949, the Dominion of Ireland became the Republic of Ireland and left the Commonwealth as a result of the Republic of Ireland Act 1948 coming into effect. Despite this, citizens of the Republic of Ireland still enlist in the British Army and thus are eligible for the Victoria Cross and other British honours.

Background

Established in 1856, the Victoria Cross has been awarded to service personnel for extraordinary valour and devotion to duty while facing a hostile force. Between 1858 and 1881 the Victoria Cross could also be awarded for actions taken "under circumstances of extreme danger" not in the face of the enemy. Six people (four Irish, one English and one Canadian) were awarded Victoria Crosses under this clause (one in 1866 during the Fenian raids, five for a single incident in 1867 during the Andaman Islands Expedition), until it was amended in 1881 to only allow acts "in the presence of the enemy". It was awarded to members of the British Armed Forces which included Irish service personnel until 1922. It is currently available to personnel of any rank in any service, and to allies serving under or with British Forces. It is the highest honour in the Commonwealth honours system, placed before all other orders, decorations and medals.

Both Catholic and Protestant officers and servicemen born in Ireland served alongside each other in the British Military. During the previous two centuries they had a common military background, and irrespective of class or creed many were decorated with the British highest award for valour. 30 Irish VCs were awarded in the Crimean War, 59 Irish VCs in the Indian Mutiny, 46 Irish VCs in numerous other British Empire campaigns between 1857 and 1914, 37 Irish VCs in World War I, and eight Irish VCs in World War II.

Recipients

See also

Irish in the British Armed Forces

References

Bibliography

Archives
 Victoria Cross Registers online index to Victoria Cross awards at the National Archives site
 The original VC warrant and comments on some amendments to 1898.
 Victoria Cross Research page
 Search UK National Inventory of War Memorial for memorials in the UK commemorating VC winners Select 'War' type of 'VC or GC Winners'

Ireland
 
Victoria Cross
Ireland and the Commonwealth of Nations